It was a Dacian fortified town.

References

Dacian fortresses in Harghita County
Historic monuments in Harghita County
Ancient history of Transylvania